Marchino is a surname. Notable people with the surname include:

Mary Anne Marchino (1938–2021), American swimmer
Nathalie Marchino (born 1981), American rugby union player

See also
Marchinko